"2–0 lead is the worst lead" is a cliché used in sporting contests, to describe the situation in which one team is leading by a score of 2–0, leading to them becoming complacent. The phrase is most common in association football, where it is sometimes applied only to the scoreline at half-time. It is sometimes also encountered in other sports where 2–0 is a moderately large lead, such as ice hockey.

Concept
The underlying concept is that, a team which is leading 2–0 will be complacent and have a 'false sense of security' in their lead. If the trailing team then scores to make it 2–1, the leading team can panic and concede further, resulting in a draw, or even a win for the other team. In contrast, a team which is leading 1–0 will tend to concentrate and play with intensity to protect or extend their narrow lead, whilst teams leading by three or more goals have a sufficiently large buffer that comebacks are unlikely.

The cliché may be invoked by coaches to encourage their players to maintain effort levels after obtaining a two-goal lead. It can also be used in broadcasting, such as by a commentator or studio pundit, to suggest that the final result is still in doubt, thereby maintaining audience interest in a game.

There is little evidence that 2–0 is the worst lead in practice. In association football, a team leading 2–0 at half-time only goes on to lose the game in about 2% of cases. In ice hockey, statistics show that if a team builds a two-goal advantage, they go on to win the game in the majority of instances, and that a one-goal lead is far more dangerous. As a result, the cliché is often used in full knowledge that 2–0 is not in fact the worst possible lead.

Examples of usage
The cliché was popularized by Czech football coach and television commentator Josef Csaplár in the Czech football community. His use of the term suggested that a 2–0 half-time lead could only end in a defeat and the cliché is known in the Czech Republic as Csaplár's trap.

In Serbia, the cliché is known for being used by manager and former player Milan Živadinović.

The cliché was also used by Australian former player and TV broadcaster Johnny Warren.

Television pundit and former England international footballer Gary Lineker questioned the cliché's veracity during a 2016 match between Bournemouth and Liverpool while the latter were 2–0 ahead. On that occasion, Liverpool did in fact surrender the lead to lose 4–3.

During the final match of the FIFA World Cup 2022 held in Qatar, Argentina maintained a 2-0 lead up until 80 minutes of the game, after which Kylian Mbappé of the French national team scored 2 goals within 97 seconds, completely breaking the lead. This led to extensive citation of the cliché among football fans, some of whom blaming Argentina for botching their lead due to their complacency as the game almost reached its end. The Argentina national team would go on to win the World Cup.

References

Association football terminology
Ice hockey terminology